Ashfield is a local government district in Nottinghamshire, England.  
The population of Ashfield was 
127,200 in 2018. The district is mostly urban and forms part of both the Nottingham and Mansfield Urban Areas. There are three towns in the district; Sutton-in-Ashfield, Kirkby-in-Ashfield and Hucknall. The district was formed on 1 April 1974, under the Local Government Act 1972, by the merger of urban districts of Hucknall, Kirkby-in-Ashfield, Sutton-in-Ashfield and parts of Basford Rural District, namely the parishes of Annesley, Felley and Selston.

The largest settlement is Sutton-in-Ashfield. Towns and villages in the district include the following:
 Annesley
 Annesley Woodhouse
 Hucknall
 Huthwaite
 Jacksdale
 Kirkby-in-Ashfield
 Selston
 Skegby
 Sutton-in-Ashfield 
 Stanton Hill
 Teversal
 Underwood

Politics

Elections to the district are held every 4 years, with currently 35 councillors being elected from 23 wards. Since 2018 the council has been led by Jason Zadrozny of the Ashfield Independents. At the 2019 elections the Ashfield Independents won 30 of the 35 seats on the council. The next elections are due in 2023.

Premises
The council is based at the Council Offices on Urban Road in Kirkby-in-Ashfield, completed in 1986 on a site behind the old headquarters (built 1933) of one of the council's predecessors, the Kirkby-in-Ashfield Urban District Council, with the old building now being known as Ada Lovelace House. The new building was officially opened in October 1986 by Birgitte, Duchess of Gloucester.

References

External links
Ashfield District Council

 
Non-metropolitan districts of Nottinghamshire